NHL FaceOff 2000  is an ice hockey video game developed by SolWorks and published by 989 Sports and Sony Computer Entertainment Europe for PlayStation in 1999. On the cover is Philadelphia Flyers star John LeClair.

Reception

The game received "average" reviews according to the review aggregation website GameRankings. Jim Preston of NextGen called it "An impressive effort. If you don't like the style of NHL 2000, this may be the one for you."

Notes

References

External links
 

1999 video games
NHL FaceOff
PlayStation (console) games
PlayStation (console)-only games
Video games developed in the United States
Video games set in 2000